The Tanzania Olympic Committee (IOC code: TAN) is the National Olympic Committee representing Tanzania. It was created and recognised by the IOC in 1968

Tanzania made its debut at the 1964 Summer Olympics in Tokyo where it was represented by four athletes.

Presidents of Committee
 2002 – Gulam Abdulla Rashid

See also
Tanzania at the Olympics
Tanzania at the Commonwealth Games

References

Tanzania
Tanzania
 
Sports governing bodies in Tanzania
Sports organizations established in 1968
1968 establishments in Tanzania